Koh Seh or Koh Ses (Khmer: កោះសេះ, also romanized as Kaoh Ses, its former French name: Ile a L’eau) is a Cambodian island located in the Gulf of Thailand, inside Ream National Park, Sihanoukville province. "Koh Seh" means Horse Island. Less than 400 meters south-west of Koh Seh lies the tiny islet of Koh Ky.

Koh Seh is uninhabited while most of its shores are fringed with mangroves. The island constitutes the south-easternmost part of Ream National Park.

Koh Seh is sometimes mistaken with Koh Ach Seh, located in Kep Archipelago.

See also
 Koh Thmei
 Ream National Park
 Koh Rong Sanloem
 Koh Rong
 Koh Sdach
 List of islands of Cambodia
 List of Cambodian inland islands
 Sihanoukville

External links
Cambodia Island Database-list of islands

References

Islands of Cambodia
Geography of Sihanoukville province
Islands of the Gulf of Thailand